Christopher Arthur Lambert (12 March 1920 – 22 September 2005) was an Australian rules footballer in the Victorian Football League (VFL).

He was a member of Essendon premiership teams in 1946 and 1950.

External links
 
 
 Chris Lambert's profile at Essendon FC

Essendon Football Club players
Essendon Football Club Premiership players
Coburg Football Club players
Coburg Football Club coaches
Australian rules footballers from Victoria (Australia)
1920 births
2005 deaths
Two-time VFL/AFL Premiership players
People from Maryborough, Victoria